Nikoloz "Nika" Kacharava (born 13 January 1994) is a Georgian professional footballer who plays as a forward for South Korean club Jeonnam Dragons. Born in Cyprus, he represents the Georgia national team.

Club career
Kacharava started his career in the second team of Dinamo Tbilisi. A promising youth, he found it hard finding opportunities to break into the Tbilisi first team and signed a contract with Rubin Kazan. Kacharava played several matches with the Rubin Kazan youth squads, but found it hard to break into the first team squad. Kacharava got his first official contract with Rubin Kazan, but became frustrated with the lack of first team opportunities.

Kacharava moved back to Georgia and signed a contract with FC Tskhinvali. In his first season, Kacharava scored only one goal - however, in the following seasons Kacharava cemented his spot in the first team, becoming a prolific scorer and one of the top forwards in the league. He attracted attention throughout Europe, eventually transferring to Rostov during one of their most successful seasons.

He spend the 2016–17 season on loan in Cyprus at Ethnikos Achna, scoring 16 goals and becoming the third-best scorer of the 2016–17 Cypriot First Division.

On 18 June 2017, he signed another year-long loan deal, joining the Polish club Korona Kielce.

On 6 June 2018, Kacharava signed a two-year contract with the Cypriot club Anorthosis Famagusta. On 24 January 2020, he signed a two-year contract extension, with a buy-out clause of €500,000.

On 8 February 2022, Kacharava joined South Korean K League 2 club Jeonnam Dragons.

International career
Kacharava was born in Cyprus to parents of Georgian descent – his father Kakhaber Kacharava was a member of the Georgia national team and his mother Lia Mikadze was a basketball player. Kacharava had successful stints with the Georgian youth national teams, and made his debut for the senior Georgian national team in a friendly 0–0 tie with Kazakhstan.

Career statistics

Club

International goals
Scores and results list Georgia's goal tally first, score column indicates score after each Kacharava goal.

References

External links 
 
 
 Rostov Profile
 

1994 births
Living people
Sportspeople from Nicosia
Association football forwards
Footballers from Georgia (country)
Georgia (country) international footballers
Georgia (country) under-21 international footballers
Cypriot footballers
Cypriot people of Georgian descent
FC Rostov players
FC Rubin Kazan players
Ethnikos Achna FC players
Korona Kielce players
Anorthosis Famagusta F.C. players
Lech Poznań players
Jeonnam Dragons players
Ekstraklasa players
K League 2 players
Expatriate footballers in Poland
Expatriate footballers in South Korea
Expatriate sportspeople from Georgia (country) in Poland